The following railroads operate in the U.S. state of Massachusetts.

Common freight carriers

Bay Colony Railroad (BCLR)
Connecticut Southern Railroad (CSO) (Genesee and Wyoming)
CSX Transportation (CSXT)
East Brookfield & Spencer Railroad (EBSR)
Fore River Transportation Corporation (FRVT)
Grafton and Upton Railroad (GU)
Housatonic Railroad (HRRC)
Massachusetts Central Railroad (MCER)
Massachusetts Coastal Railroad (MC)
New England Central Railroad (NECR) (Genesee and Wyoming)
Pan Am Railways (PAR)
Pan Am Southern (PAS) (Operated by Pan Am Railways)
Pioneer Valley Railroad (PVRR) (Pinsly)
Providence and Worcester Railroad (PW) (Genesee and Wyoming)

Passenger carriers

Amtrak (AMTK)
Berkshire Scenic Railway (BRMX)
Cape Cod Central Railroad (CCCR)
Edaville Railroad 
Massachusetts Bay Transportation Authority (MBTX)
Hartford Line (CNDX)

Defunct railroads

Street and other electric railways
Berkshire Street Railway
Boston Elevated Railway
Boston and Worcester Street Railway
Cambridge Railroad
Conway Electric Street Railway
Eastern Massachusetts Street Railway
Grafton and Upton Railroad
Metropolitan Railroad
Middlesex and Boston Street Railway
Middlesex Railroad
Milford and Uxbridge Street Railway
Palmer and Monson Street Railway
Pittsfield Electric Street Railway
Shelburne Falls and Colrain Street Railway
South Boston Railroad
Springfield and Eastern Street Railway
Upton Street Railway
West End Street Railway

Private carriers
Deerfield River Pulp and Paper Corporation

Not completed
Hampden Railroad
Lancaster Railroad
New York and Boston Rapid Transit Company
Southern New England Railway

Notes

See also
List of railroad lines in Massachusetts (a list of all corridors that have existed, not dealing with ownership changes)
List of United States railroads

References
Association of American Railroads (2003), Railroad Service in Massachusetts (PDF). Retrieved May 12, 2005.

External links
 Massachusetts State Rail Plan, 2010 - Contains maps, statistics, and proposed projects for railroads in Massachusetts

 
 
Massachusetts
Railroads